Rodinskoye is a rural locality (a selo) and the administrative center of Rodinskoye Rural Settlement, Yelansky District, Volgograd Oblast, Russia. The population was 292 as of 2010. There are 6 streets.

Geography 
Rodinskoye is located on Khopyorsko-Buzulukskaya Plain, on the left bank of the Odaryushka River, 33 km southwest of Yelan (the district's administrative centre) by road. Kalinovsky is the nearest rural locality.

References 

Rural localities in Yelansky District